Khadija Ryadi (born 1960 in Taroudant) is a Moroccan Human rights, feminist activist and former  president of the Morocco Association for Human Rights (AMDH). In December 2013, she won the United Nations Prize in the Field of Human Rights.

Ryadi graduated as a statistical engineer and worked at the Ministry of Economy and Finance. She was a member of the Annahj Addimocrati political party.

See also
Ali Lmrabet
Aboubakr Jamaï
Abdellatif Zeroual
Ali Anouzla

References

1960 births
Berber activists
Berber feminists
Human rights in Morocco
Living people
Moroccan activists
Moroccan women activists
Moroccan democracy activists
Moroccan engineers
Moroccan Berber politicians
People from Taroudannt
Shilha people